Ultra Truth is an album by English musician Daniel Avery. It was released on 4 November 2022 through Phantasy Sound. It features guest appearances from HAAi, Jonnine, James Massiah, Kelly Lee Owens, A. K. Paul and Sherelle.

Track listing
All tracks are produced by Daniel Avery except where noted.

Charts

References

2022 albums
Daniel Avery (musician) albums
Phantasy (record label) albums